Hello Friends is a Hindi language sitcom that premiered on Zee TV channel on 6 September 1999. The series is an Indian adaptation of the American sitcom Friends.  It ran for one season of 26 episodes.

Premise
Hello Friends is a comedy about six lovable, humorous, fun-loving friends and their adventures and misadventures.

Cast
Simone Singh as Sanjana (Monica Geller)
Aparna Tilak as Nisha  (Rachel Green)
Maria Goretti as Penny (Phoebe Buffay)
Cyrus Broacha as Cyrus  (Chandler Bing)
Nikhil Chinapa as Vikram (Ross Geller) and Akram (in the last episode)
Anil Dimbri as Rahul  (Joey Tribbiani)
Kunal Vijaykar as Uncle Sam 
Mandira Bedi as Julie
Jyoti Gauba
Kishwer Merchant
Shehzad Khan
Bhavana Balsavar as Konika
Eva Grover as Priya
Rituraj Singh as Amit 
Samir Soni

References

External links

Friends (1994 TV series)
1990s sitcoms
2000s sitcoms
Zee TV original programming
Indian comedy television series
Indian television series based on American television series
1999 Indian television series debuts
2000 Indian television series endings